Mauger Nunatak is a nunatak,  high, about  northeast of Mount Block in the Grosvenor Mountains of Antarctica. It was named by the New Zealand Geological Survey Antarctic Expedition (1961–62) for Clarence Charles Mauger, a crew member of the Aurora, the vessel which transported the Ross Sea party of Ernest Shackleton's Imperial Trans-Antarctic Expedition (1914–17) from Australia to the Ross Sea.

References

Nunataks of the Ross Dependency
Dufek Coast